Leandro N. Alem was an Argentine politician.

Leandro N. Alem may also refer to:
Leandro N. Alem, Buenos Aires Province, Argentina
Leandro N. Alem Partido, Buenos Aires Province, Argentina
Leandro N. Alem, Misiones, Argentina
Leandro N. Alem, San Luis, Argentina
Leandro N. Alem Avenue, Buenos Aires, Argentina
Leandro N. Alem (Buenos Aires Metro), a metro station in Buenos Aires, Argentina.
Club Leandro N. Alem, an Argentine football club.